The Alabama Southern Railroad  is a class III railroad that operates in the southern United States. The ABS is one of several short line railroads owned by Watco. The railroad operates an  line leased from the Kansas City Southern Railway (KCSR). It began operating in 2005.

History
The railroad began operating on November 20, 2005 on lines leased from the Kansas City Southern Railway.

The line was originally constructed by the Mobile & Ohio Railroad which was purchased through a foreclosure sale by the Gulf, Mobile & Ohio Railroad (GM&O) on August 1, 1940. The GM&O merged with the Illinois Central on August 10, 1972, resulting in the Illinois Central Gulf Railroad. On March 31, 1986, MidSouth Rail purchased  of track, which included this line, from the Illinois Central Gulf.  On January 1, 1994, the Kansas City Southern bought out Midsouth Rail.

Lines

The Alabama Southern's line is composed of three Kansas City Southern branch lines totaling : 
The Tuscaloosa Subdivision (Columbus–Tuscaloosa)
The Warrior Branch (Tuscaloosa–Fox, Alabama)
The Brookwood Branch (Brookwood, Alabama–Brookwood Junction). 

The line runs between Columbus and Brookwood, with trackage rights over the Kansas City Southern from Columbus to Artesia, Mississippi. The railroad interchanges with the KCSR at Artesia, CSX Transportation in Brookwood, and the Norfolk Southern Railway in Tuscaloosa.

See also

List of United States railroads
List of Alabama railroads
Watco List of all of Watco's railroads

References

Notes 
 Alabama Southern Rail Map
 Trains.com Information on MidSouth Rail 
 SPV's Comprehensive Railroad Atlas of North America – Southern States by Mike Walker (Steam Powered Publishing & SPV, 2001) Ownership and detail of rail line.

External links
 

2005 establishments in Alabama
Alabama railroads
Mississippi railroads
Railway companies established in 2005
Spin-offs of the Kansas City Southern Railway
Watco